"Ball & Chain" is a song by English musician Elton John with lyrics by Gary Osborne. It is the third track on his 1982 album Jump Up! and was released as a single in the United States in September that year. It features Pete Townshend of The Who on acoustic guitar. Osborne added some French words into the song.

Musical structure
The song opens with Townshend's percussive guitar playing, and subtle piano from Elton. The song then builds to a climactic finish, placing the final verse one octave higher.

Release
It was released in the US in September 1982 without charting and was performed by John during the 1982 leg of his Jump Up Tour. In 1985, Country music artist Kathy Mattea covered the song on her second album From My Heart.

Billboard called it "plain good fun, with a buoyant rhythm guitar and crisp production."

Music video 
A promotional video was made for this song featuring John singing the song without playing piano with his classic band performing in a white background.

Personnel 
 Elton John – vocals, acoustic piano
 James Newton Howard – synthesizers 
 Pete Townshend – acoustic guitar
 Richie Zito  – electric guitar
 Dee Murray – bass
 Jeff Porcaro – drums
 Steve Holly – tambourine

References

Elton John songs
1982 songs
1982 singles
Songs with music by Elton John
Songs with lyrics by Gary Osborne
Song recordings produced by Chris Thomas (record producer)
Geffen Records singles